Free Time: The Forgotten American Dream is a 2013 book by Benjamin Kline Hunnicutt on the connection between the American Dream and American leisure time.

Bibliography

External links 
 

2013 non-fiction books
English-language books
Books by Benjamin Kline Hunnicutt
Temple University Press books